Melita Airport  is located adjacent to Melita, Manitoba, Canada.

References

Registered aerodromes in Manitoba